Pleasantville may refer to:

Places

Canada
 Pleasantville, a defunct community located inside the modern boundaries of Newmarket, Ontario
 Pleasantville, Newfoundland and Labrador
 Pleasantville (electoral district) - former electoral district in Newfoundland

United States
 Pleasantville, Indiana
 Pleasantville, Iowa
 Pleasantville, New Jersey
 Pleasantville, New York
 Pleasantville, Ohio
 Pleasantville, Pennsylvania
 Pleasantville, Bedford County, Pennsylvania
 Pleasantville, Berks County, Pennsylvania
 Pleasantville, Bucks County, Pennsylvania
 Pleasantville, Venango County, Pennsylvania
 Pleasantville, Houston, a neighborhood located in Houston, Texas
 Pleasantville, Wisconsin

Other
 Pleasantville, a 1976 film with cinematography by Walter Lassally
 Pleasantville (film), a 1998 fantasy comedy-drama film
 Pleasantville, the fictional town and setting for the TV series Big Wolf on Campus